Bruno Miguel de Almeida Lima Gomes Bernardo (born ), known as Jardel, is a Portuguese futsal player who plays as a pivot and winger for Belenenses Jardel was capped 28 times for the Portugal national team and competed in the 2008 FIFA Futsal World Cup.

References

External links

Jardel at playmakerstats.com (formerly thefinalball.com)

1979 births
Living people
Portuguese men's futsal players
S.L. Benfica futsal players
C.F. Os Belenenses futsal players